Injury Reserve is the debut studio album by American rap group Injury Reserve, released on May 17, 2019, through Loma Vista Recordings. This is their only release under Loma Vista, before departing shortly after the death of bandmate, Stepa J. Groggs. It follows several mixtapes by the group, including Live from the Dentist Office, 2016's Floss and 2017's extended play Drive It Like It's Stolen. The album features artists such as A-Trak, Rico Nasty, Aminé, DRAM, Freddie Gibbs, Cakes da Killa, Dylan Brady, Pro Teens, Tony Velour, and JPEGMafia.

Critical reception

At Metacritic, the album earned a score of 75 out of 100, indicating "generally favorable reviews".

Much of the praise was directed at Corey's production. In a positive review for the album, Chris Dart of Exclaim! called him "Injury Reserve's real driving force", and Kyle Kohner of The 405 wrote that Corey "mix[es] things up with some of the most wonky-sounding production you will hear outside of Death Grips". Sheldon Pearce was more reserved in his assessment for Pitchfork, giving the album a 6.8/10, and wrote that while the album feels "remarkably fresh and singular" when Corey is at his best, "neither Ritchie nor Stepa are particularly groundbreaking MCs" and that they are both "regularly shown up by their guests". He concluded that Injury Reserve "gets stuck between its experimental urges and its pop ambitions" too often, calling the album "never quite noisy enough or quite catchy enough".

Track listing

 "What a Year It's Been" contains samples of "13 Angels Standing Guard 'Round the Side of Your Bed." by Silver Mt. Zion.

References

2019 debut albums
Injury Reserve albums
Loma Vista Recordings albums
Albums produced by Dylan Brady